Simon Fieldhouse (born 25 March 1956) is an artist based in Sydney, Australia. He was educated at Newington College (1963), Barker College, Geelong Grammar School and The University of Sydney where he obtained a Bachelor of Arts.

He studied law and practiced briefly as a solicitor, ceasing in 1988.

He was co-author of Portraits on Yellow Paper with former Supreme Court of New South Wales judge Roderick Meagher. His works have been exhibited widely and his paintings used to illustrate the National Trust desk diaries "Historic Architecture of Australia" in 2002 and "Historic Architecture of Australia II" in 2004.  The Chancellor's Committee of The University of Sydney produced a collection of greeting and gift cards using some of his University paintings in 2002.

He has produced many paintings depicting historic Australian architecture with whimsical characters.

In 2006, he was commissioned by the Faculty of Medicine at the University of Sydney to produce 35 portraits of its professors of medicine.  This series follows that of Sir Lionel Lindsay, who produced professors' portraits in 1916.

Fieldhouse also has completed a series of paintings of historic architecture of New York City.

References

External links

Simon Fieldhouse website, including some examples of his artwork
New York Historic Architecture series
Simon Fieldhouse

1956 births
Living people
Australian painters
20th-century Australian lawyers
People educated at Geelong Grammar School
People educated at Newington College
Artists from Sydney
People educated at Barker College